Nebraska Avenue Complex (also called NAC), located at 3801 Nebraska Avenue NW in, Washington D.C. It was the former headquarters of the Mount Vernon Seminary and the Navy Communication Security Section and other U.S. military organizations. Currently it houses the United States Department of Homeland Security.  The site is located at AU Park and is bound by Nebraska and Massachusetts Avenue.

History

Facility for Department of the Navy and National Security Agency 

Between 1917 and 1942, the complex housed Mount Vernon Seminary. By the end of 1942, the United States Department of the Navy took over the buildings, and formally acquired the land for $1.1 million US dollars on July 20, 1943. After they acquired the land, the area was renamed to the Communications Supplementary Annex.

Between February 1943 and July 1946, the Annex housed the Communication Security Section, which was relocated from the Main Navy Department building in Washington, D.C. It changed to Navy Communications Station (also known as NAVCOMMSTA Washington (NCSW)) on July 7, 1948, and was redesignated as the Naval Security Station (NAVSECSTA) on September 21, 1950. Between June 1943 and December 1949, the Annex also housed Naval Code and Signals Laboratory.

In September 1950, the Communications Security Group and the Communications Supplementary Activity Washington, merged to officially form the establishment of the Naval Security Group, headquartered at NAVSECSTA. From 1951 onwards, the Station housed Armed Forces Security Agency units and after creation of the National Security Agency (NSA) in 1952, the Station housed NSA headquarters and its Security Branch, Naval Communications Division.

In 1956, NSA Security Branch, Naval Communications Division was redesigned into Naval Security Group Headquarters Activity. By 1961 it changed to Naval Security Group Headquarters, Washington D.C. and in 1968 to Naval Security Group Command, Washington D.C. In 1971 it was redesigned as Naval Security Group Command Headquarters.

The Communication Security Group (COMNAVSECGRU) headquarters staff officially moved from NAVSECSTA to Fort George G. Meade in November 1995.

Naval Computer and Telecommunications Command was present in the area between December 1990 and August 2001.

On October 16, 1998 Naval Security Station officially disestablished and became the Nebraska Avenue Complex. From 1998 to 2005, the Complex was home to Naval Center for Cost Analysis, Naval District Washington Public Safety, Director of Strategic Systems Programs, Office of Civilian Personnel Management and the Navy International Programs Office.

Department of Homeland Security headquarters 
In 2002, the Complex housed Office of Homeland Security, established the year prior. After it was reformed into the United States Department of Homeland Security, the Nebraska Avenue Complex became the main headquarters for the department. Since 2005, the Nebraska Avenue Complex has been owned by the General Services Administration. DHS operations were soon spread across several dozen buildings in the Washington area, however, as the Complex could only accommodate a small portion of its total staff. This prompted a search for a larger headquarters, leading to the purchase of St. Elizabeths Hospital West Campus in 2007, but as of 2019, construction and renovation was still underway, and only some personnel had been transferred.

References

Government buildings on the National Register of Historic Places in Washington, D.C.
United States Department of Homeland Security
Buildings of the United States government in Washington, D.C.